(lit. “Clouds Above the Slope”) is a Japanese war drama television series which was aired on NHK over three years, from November 29, 2009 to December 2011, as a special taiga drama. The series runs 13 episodes at 90 minutes each. The first season, with 5 episodes, was broadcast in 2009, while seasons two and three, each with 4 episodes, were broadcast in late 2010 and 2011. While most episodes were shot in Japan, one of the episodes in season two was shot in Latvia. The TV series is based on the 1968 novel of the same name by Ryōtarō Shiba and adapted by Hisashi Nozawa.

Executive producer Yoshiko Nishimura acquired the rights to the novel from Shiba's widow Midori Fukuda in 2001, after decades of the author refusing to let anyone adapt his controversial work for the screen. The NHK officially announced their intention to adapt the novel in 2003, though shooting would only begin in 2008. The series is the first taiga drama to be mainly set during the Meiji era, thus its production encountered more difficulties than usual in achieving an accurate depiction of its setting. It is now the most expensive taiga drama ever produced.

The theme song of the drama series is titled "Stand Alone". It was composed by Joe Hisaishi, written by Kundō Koyama, and performed by British soprano singer Sarah Brightman.

Production
Production credits
Based on the novel by – Ryōtarō Shiba 
Script – Hisashi Nozawa
Music – Joe Hisaishi
Titling – Ryōtarō Shiba
Historical research – Yasushi Toriumi
Narrator – Ken Watanabe
Production coordinator – Yasuhiro Kan
Casting – Mineyo Satō

Development
During the 1970s, executive producer Yoshiko Nishimura read the 1968 novel Saka no Ue no Kumo by Ryōtarō Shiba when he was a student at the University of Tokyo. Though he dreamt of what the novel would look like on screen, his seniors at the NHK drama department thought that adapting the work was inconceivable; Shiba continuously refused throughout his life to let anyone adapt his controversial work for the screen.

By the 1990s, Nishimura would travel to Hollywood to study filmmaking, gaining inspiration to mount an epic narrative on television that would elevate the status of the medium in Japan, which was considered by people to be inferior to cinema. In 2000, Nishimura visited Shiba's widow Midori Fukuda to give his condolences, and presented to her his argument for a television adaptation of Shiba's novel: that it would encourage young people to read the novel after seeing the story onscreen. After a year of deliberation, Fukuda relented and provided Nishimura with the novel's adaptation rights. The NHK would officially announce their intention to adapt the novel as a taiga drama by 2003.

Writing and filming
Preparations for Saka no Ue no Kumo took three times as long as a regular NHK taiga drama. The series was originally scheduled to begin its broadcast by 2006, but the suicide of writer Hisashi Nozawa in 2004 lead to the postponement of production. The usual taiga drama production would first have one-third of the total number of scripts finished before shooting, with audience reception taken into account as the rest of the series is written; Saka no Ue no Kumo only began shooting in 2008 once all 13 ninety-minute scripts were finished.

The Meiji era had never been depicted as the main setting of a taiga drama before, thus the television crew encountered more difficulties than usual in creating the visuals for the era due to a lack of familiar images. Research into the military background of the time especially highlighted the differences between the Meiji military and the Shōwa military; according to Nishimura, no visual image of the Meiji era's military has ever been made that has actually stuck in the Japanese' imaginations, while the Shōwa era has been the default image in their minds.

In adapting the novel for television, the crew addressed the lack of female characters in the original work by including scenes which depicted what the women were doing and thinking about in Japan during both the First Sino-Japanese War and the Russo-Japanese War. For Nishimura, "those scenes are one of the things worth noticing in a special drama like this one."

The series has since become the most expensive taiga drama ever produced by NHK.

Cast

Akiyama family
Masahiro Motoki as Akiyama Saneyuki
Hiroshi Abe as Akiyama Yoshifuru
Shōta Sometani as young Yoshifuru
Shirō Itō as Akiyama Hisataka
Keiko Takeshita as Akiyama Sada
Takako Matsu as Akiyama Tami

Masaoka family
Teruyuki Kagawa as Masaoka Shiki
Miho Kanno as Masaoka Ritsu
Riko Yoshida as young Ritsu
Mieko Harada as Masaoka Yae
Ichiro Shinjitsu as Ōhara Kanzan
Yūto Uemura as Katō Tsunetada

Navy officials and their family
Takahiro Fujimoto as Takeo Hirose
Tsurutarō Kataoka as Yashiro Rokurō
Tetsuya Watari as Tōgō Heihachirō
Kōji Ishizaka as Yamamoto Gonbei
Masao Kusakari as Katō Tomosaburō
Hiroshi Tachi as Shimamura Hayao
Masaya Kato as Arima Ryokitsu
Akira Nakao as Hidaka Sōnojō
Kisuke Iida as Takarabe Takeshi
Hidekazu Akai as Kantarō Suzuki

Army officials and their family
Kōji Matoba as Gaishi Nagaoka
Hideki Takahashi as Kodama Gentarō
Tōru Emori as Yamagata Aritomo
Masakane Yonekura as Ōyama Iwao
Akira Emoto as Nogi Maresuke
Kyōko Maya as Nogi Shizuko
Shinya Tsukamoto as Akashi Motojiro
Jun Kunimura as Kawakami Soroku
Takehiro Murata as Ijichi Kōsuke
Takaaki Enoki as Mori Rintarō
Daijirō Tsutsumi as Iguchi Shōgo
Atsushi Miyauchi as Fujii Shigeta

Politicians and their family
Go Kato as Itō Hirobumi
Toshiyuki Nishida as Takahashi Korekiyo
Naoto Takenaka as Komura Jutarō
Ren Ōsugi as Mutsu Munemitsu
Shinya Owada as Inoue Kaoru
Toshiki Ayata as Katsura Tarō
Kanta Ogata as Kaneko Kentarō

Ordinary people
Shirō Sano as Kuga Katsunan
Kenzō as Kojima Ichinen
Yukiyoshi Ozawa as Natsume Sōseki

Foreigners
Julian Glover as Alfred Thayer Mahan
Marina Aleksandrova as Ariadna
Timofei Fyodorov as Nicholas II of Russia
Norbert Gort as Jakob Meckel
Tim Wellard as Prince George of Greece and Denmark
Gennadi Vengerov as Yevgeni Ivanovich Alekseyev

Others
Onoe Kikunosuke V as Emperor Meiji

Series overview

Season 1 : 1868 - 1900

Season 2 : 1900 - 1904

Season 3 : Russo-Japanese War

Rating is based on Japanese video research(Kantō region).

Soundtrack and books

Soundtrack
"Saka no Ue no Kumo" Original Soundtrack (December 18, 2009) EMI Music Japan

Books
NHK Special Drama, Historical Handbook, Saka no Ue no Kumo (October 30, 2009) 
NHK Special Drama Guide, Saka no Ue no Kumo Part 1 (October 30, 2009) 
NHK Special Drama Guide, Saka no Ue no Kumo Part 2 (October 25, 2010)

Accolades

References

External links
NHK website

2009 Japanese television series debuts
2011 Japanese television series endings
First Sino-Japanese War
Russo-Japanese War
Taiga drama
Television shows based on Japanese novels
Television series set in the 1860s
Television series set in the 1880s
Television series set in the 1890s
Television series set in the 1900s
Works by Joe Hisaishi